Árni Óðinsson (born 24 February 1950) is an Icelandic alpine skier. He competed in the men's giant slalom at the 1976 Winter Olympics.  He was the oldest Icelandic alpinist, and ensign of the Icelandic team at these Games.

References

1950 births
Living people
Árni Ódinsson
Árni Ódinsson
Alpine skiers at the 1976 Winter Olympics
Árni Óðinsson
20th-century Icelandic people